MV American Integrity is a ship built in 1978 by Bay Shipbuilding Company in Sturgeon Bay, Wisconsin. She is one of the thirteen 1,000 footers in the Great Lakes laker fleet. She was originally built as Lewis Wilson Foy and was renamed Oglebay Norton in 1991. She was renamed again after the sale to American Steamship Company in June, 2006.  On September 24, 2017 the American Integrity broke the all-time record for the largest load through the Soo Locks with 75,095 tons of iron ore beating the record held for the last two weeks by the Edwin H. Gott. She was loaded to a draft of 29 ft 7 in on her way to Indiana Harbor.

Her overall length is 1000 feet, beam is 105 feet and depth 56 feet. She is able to unload 10,000 tons/hour. She has 7 cargo holds and 37 hatches. She has 14,000 horsepower and 2 propellers.

References

External links 

 http://www.americansteamship.com/fleet/mv-american-integrity.php

1978 ships
Great Lakes freighters
Ships built in Sturgeon Bay, Wisconsin
Merchant ships of the United States